Andar Baahar is a 2013 Kannada action film starring Shiva Rajkumar and Parvathy in the lead. The film is directed by Phaneesh Ramanathapura and produced by a host of USA Kannadiga friends under the Legends International Group banner. Popular playback singer Vijay Prakash made his debut as a music composer for this film.

The film tells the story of the relationship between a newly married criminal and his wife. The movie ended as a disaster.

Cast
 Shiva Rajkumar as Surya
 Parvathy as Suhasini
 Shashikumar as Patil
 Srinath
 Arundathi Nag
 Raghuram
 Srujan Lokesh
 Spoorthi Suresh
 Raghuram
 Chasva
 Vathsala Mohan
 Sangeetha
 Vijayasarathi

Soundtrack

The soundtrack of the album was released on 10 February 2013. Andhar Bahar consists of five songs composed by singer Vijay Prakash debut as a  music director and composer.

Reception

Critical response 

Srikanth Srinivasa of Rediff.com scored the film at 2 out of 5 stars and says "
Director Phaneesh could have put a lot more drama into his narrative. There are some flaws that the audiences can easily spot that could have been avoided. The film is a tad too long with some unnecessary scenes. Andar Bahar is a family entertainer that is a good watch". A critic from The Times of India scored the film at 3.5 out of 5 stars and wrote "Shivrajkumar is a master in both action and sentimental sequences. Parvathi Menon is equally brilliant. Raghuram shines as the hero’s friend. The Srinath-Arundhati Nag pair is disappointing. Shekhar Chandra has captured some lovely frames with his camera. Vijay Prakash has done a good job as music director". A Shardhha of The New Indian Express wrote The Verdict : Hope the other side of Shivarajkumar works wonders with the audience. A must-see for an all round fine performance". B S Srivani from Deccan Herald wrote "Andhar Bahar offers a peek into the conflict and subsequent turmoil inside a soul which influences all our actions. A must-watch for Shivanna, and sensible film, fans". A critic from Bangalore Mirror wrote  "There are two star performers in the movie. One, Parvathi Menon, who despite a slight accent that reminds you of Tamil actress Suhasini dubbing in Kannada, gives a brilliant performance which sometimes outdoes even Shiva Rajkumar. The other is cinematographer Shekar Chandru. He is a true magician. The film is good only if you manage to sit through it completely".

References

External links
 

2010s Kannada-language films
2013 films
Indian action drama films
Indian gangster films
2013 action drama films
Films set in hospitals
Indian films about cancer